Kamilo Mašek (July 11, 1831 – June 29, 1859) was a Slovenian of Czech descent and music composer. Mašek was a son of Czech-born Kašpar Mašek. Mašek had introduced more romantic influence into Slovenian music. His compositions include various sacred works.

Works
 Overture to the melodrama Judith (1854), for orchestra
 Polkas for wind orchestra
 Divertimento for two violas, two cellos and double bass (1854)
 Fantasy for piano and melofon
 Choral Music: The Lake
 Songs, a wreath of songs on texts by France Prešeren

References

1831 births
1859 deaths
19th-century Carniolan people
19th-century composers
Carniolan composers
Carniolan people of Czech descent